The Ibanez Edge Tremolo is a double locking tremolo system for the electric guitar very similar in design to the original Floyd Rose. It first appeared in the Ibanez product line as of the 1986 model year; however, they have appeared on guitars with 1985 serial numbers. The Edge offers a number of improvements from the Original Floyd Rose, namely locking studs (for improved tuning stability, added in 1987–8), a spring retainer on the tremolo block (again, added in 1987–8) and a pop-in arm.

A non-locking version, Edge II, appeared on the Vinnie Moore signature guitar in 1989. The guitar employed a low-friction nut and locking tuners.

The Edge enjoyed massive success in the late 1980s and is still the tremolo of choice for players such as Steve Vai and Joe Satriani. Tom Morello has also been known to install these tremolos in his non-Ibanez guitars.

In 2003, the patent for the Original Floyd Rose tremolo expired. This coincided with the release of a newly designed pair of Tremolos from Ibanez, the Edge Pro and the Edge Pro II. Ibanez mistakenly figured that all the Floyd Rose patents were available for use; however, the patent on the Low Profile design was still in effect. This prompted the Edge Pro II's replacement with Edge III which fits into the parameters of the original patent and is therefore not subject to a license fee. The Edge Pro and Edge Pro II differ from the original Edge, as they are able to accept strings with the ball-ends still attached, and have no locking studs. Due to the lack of locking studs, the tremolo is in some ways inferior to the models it replaces; however, the lower profile design and ergonomic improvements mean this distinction is not clear cut. The Original and Lo-Pro Edge are still produced and are available through Ibanez Parts dealers. Positioned as top-of-the-line locking tremolo systems, the Original and Lo-Pro Edge are among the most expensive pieces of guitar hardware in mass production, with a unit cost higher than the Floyd Rose Original and the Schaller Floyd Rose, and indeed more expensive than even a number of Ibanez guitars (including ones with lower-tier locking tremolos). The Original Edge is still being used by Ibanez for certain RG series reissues, and all 2010 Ibanez JEM and JS series guitars.

See also 

Ibanez RG
Ibanez ZR, the other line of locking tremolo Ibanez produces.

External links
 The Ibanez Edge with handrest installed

Guitar parts and accessories
Guitar bridges